ʻOʻua is an island in Lulunga district, in the Haʻapai islands of Tonga. The population is 45.

References

Islands of Tonga